The Man with the Axe may refer to:

 "The Man with the Axe", a 2021 song by Lorde from Solar Power
 Parashuram (1979 film)